These are the official results of the women's 4 × 100 m relay event at the 1988 Summer Olympics in Seoul, South Korea. There were a total number of 19 nations competing.

This was a race between three strong teams with many athletes at their peak. From the gun, Alice Brown was out fastest for the US in lane 6, almost making up the stagger on Zvetanka Ilieva leading off for Bulgaria on her outside. Meanwhile, East German star, 1987 World Champion Silke Möller was losing ground in lane 5 as Soviet Lyudmila Kondratyeva was gaining in lane 4. All the handoffs were efficient before both Kerstin Behrendt and Galina Malchugina closed the gap on the American Sheila Echols on the second leg. The American handoff to the year's phenom, world record holder Florence Griffith-Joyner was safe but not particularly efficient, the East German underhanded pass to Ingrid Auerswald is a textbook demonstration of an efficient handoff, and gave East Germany the lead. It would still be expected that the way FloJo dominated the sprint events, she would be able to pull away from Auerswald, but running the longer distance around the turn she only made a marginal gain and Marina Zhirova also put the Soviet team in close contention. Both the Soviet team and East German teams executed efficient handoffs, leaving Natalya Pomoshchnikova just slightly behind 1983 World Champion Marlies Göhr. The American handoff was not as efficient as Griffith-Joyner ran up on veteran anchor Evelyn Ashford leaving USA two metres behind. Pomoshchnikova accelerated and was able to pull even with Göhr while Ashford was in full stride and gaining. 50 metres from the finish it was three abreast across the center of the track. Ashford continued right past Göhr to a meter and a half victory. The three teams were so far ahead of the rest of the world that Pomoshchnikova, despite pulling a muscle 30 m from the finish, was able to limp across the finish line ahead of the West German team for the bronze medal.

Records
These were the standing World and Olympic records (in seconds) prior to the 1988 Summer Olympics.

Final
Held on Saturday 1988-10-01

Semifinals

 Heat 1

 Heat 2

Heats

 Heat 1

 Heat 2

 Heat 3

See also
 1986 Women's European Championships 4 × 100 m Relay (Stuttgart)
 1987 Women's World Championships 4 × 100 m Relay (Rome)
 1990 Women's European Championships 4 × 100 m Relay (Split)
 1991 Women's World Championships 4 × 100 m Relay (Tokyo)

References

External links
 Official Report
 Results

R
Relay foot races at the Olympics
1988 in women's athletics
Women's events at the 1988 Summer Olympics